Deerfield, Ohio could refer to the following places:

Deerfield Township, Morgan County, Ohio
Deerfield Township, Portage County, Ohio
Deerfield Township, Ross County, Ohio
Deerfield Township, Warren County, Ohio
South Lebanon, Ohio, a village originally known as Deerfield